Rafael Andrés Lezcano Montero (born 5 May 1990) is a professional footballer who plays as a forward for Liga Nacional club Comunicaciones. Born in Costa Rica, he plays for the Guatemala national team.

Club career
Lezcano began his playing career in Costa Rica with Herediano in the Liga FPD in 2008, before moving to Cartaginés from 2010 to 2015. He had stints with the other Costa Rican clubs Alajuelense and Pérez Zeledón before moving to Guatemala in 2017 with Deportivo Carchá. He had spells with Malacateco and Antigua, before transferring to Comunicaciones in 2020. He helped Comunicaciones win the 2021 CONCACAF League.

International career
Born in Costa Rica, Lezcano was naturalized as a Guatemalan citizen after 5 years of residency and became available for the Guatemala national team. He debuted for Guatemala in a friendly 1–0 win over Cuba on 24 March 2022.

Honours
Cartaginés
 Costa Rican Cup: 2014

Antigua
 Liga Nacional de Guatemala: Clausura 2019

Comunicaciones
 CONCACAF League: 2021
 Liga Nacional de Guatemala: Clausura 2022

References

External links
 
 

1990 births
Living people
People from Limón Province
Guatemalan footballers
Guatemala international footballers
Costa Rican footballers
Costa Rican emigrants to Guatemala
Naturalized citizens of Guatemala
C.S. Herediano footballers
L.D. Alajuelense footballers
Municipal Pérez Zeledón footballers
Antigua GFC players
Comunicaciones F.C. players
Liga FPD players
Liga Nacional de Fútbol de Guatemala players
Association football forwards
Costa Rican expatriate footballers
Costa Rican expatriate sportspeople in Guatemala
Expatriate footballers in Guatemala